is a Japanese track cyclist. At the 2012 Summer Olympics, he competed in the Men's team sprint for the national team. He is also active in Japan as a keirin cyclist.

He has qualified to represent Japan at the 2020 Summer Olympics.

Results in major competitions

8th 2012 Summer Olympics, Men's team sprint
13th 2012–2013 UCI Track Cycling World Cup Classic in Glasgow – Men's keirin

References

External links

1986 births
Japanese male cyclists
Japanese track cyclists
Living people
Olympic cyclists of Japan
Cyclists at the 2012 Summer Olympics
Cyclists at the 2020 Summer Olympics
Sportspeople from Fukushima Prefecture
Asian Games medalists in cycling
Cyclists at the 2006 Asian Games
Cyclists at the 2010 Asian Games
Cyclists at the 2018 Asian Games
Keirin cyclists
Asian Games gold medalists for Japan
Asian Games silver medalists for Japan
Asian Games bronze medalists for Japan
Medalists at the 2006 Asian Games
Medalists at the 2010 Asian Games
Medalists at the 2018 Asian Games
People from Aizuwakamatsu